Ordinary Hero may refer to:
 Un eroe borghese, also known as Ordinary Hero, a 1995 Italian historical drama film
 Ordinary Hero (2022 film), a Chinese drama film

See also
 Ordinary Heroes (disambiguation)